Charles Martel was a pre-dreadnought battleship of the French Navy built in the 1890s. Completed in 1897, she was a member of a group of five broadly similar battleships ordered as part of the French response to a major British naval construction program. The five ships were built to the same basic design parameters, though the individual architects were allowed to deviate from each other in other details. Like her half-sisters—, and —she was armed with a main battery of two  guns and two  guns.

Charles Martel spent her active career in the Escadre de la Méditerranée (Mediterranean Squadron) of the French fleet, first in the active squadron, and later in the Escadre de réserve (Reserve Squadron). She regularly participated in fleet maneuvers, and in the 1901 exercises, the submarine  hit her with a training torpedo. Charles Martel spent just five years in the active squadron, having been surpassed by more modern battleships during a period of rapid developments in naval technology. She spent the years 1902–1914 mostly in reserve, and the navy decommissioned the vessel in early 1914, hulking her and converting her into a barracks ship. After the outbreak of World War I in August, her guns were removed for use on the front and she briefly served as a prison ship. Charles Martel was condemned in 1919 and was sold for scrap the following year.

Design 

In 1889, the British Royal Navy passed the Naval Defence Act that resulted in the construction of the eight s; this major expansion of naval power led the French government to pass its reply, the Statut Naval (Naval Law) of 1890. The law called for a total of twenty-four "cuirasses d'escadre" (squadron battleships) and a host of other vessels, including coastal defense battleships, cruisers, and torpedo boats. The first stage of the program was to be a group of four squadron battleships that were built to different designs but met the same basic characteristics, including armor, armament, and displacement. The secondary battery was to be either  or  caliber, with as many guns fitted as space would allow.

The basic design for the ships was based on the previous battleship , but instead of mounting the main battery all on the centerline, the ships used the lozenge arrangement of the earlier , which moved two of the main battery guns to single turrets on the wings. Five naval architects submitted designs to the high command; the design that became Charles Martel was prepared by Charles Ernest Huin, who had also designed the ironclad battleship . Huin submitted his finalized proposal in line with these considerations on 12 August 1890, and it was accepted and ordered on 10 September.

An earlier vessel, also named Charles Martel, had been laid down in 1884 and cancelled under the tenure of Admiral Théophile Aube. The vessel, along with a sister ship named Brennus, was a modified version of the  ironclad battleships. After Aube's retirement in 1887, the plans for the ships were entirely redesigned, though the later pair of ships are sometimes conflated with the earlier, cancelled designs. This may be due to the fact that both of the ships named Brennus were built in the same shipyard, and material assembled for the first vessel was used in the construction of the second. The two pairs of ships were, nevertheless, distinct vessels.

The ships suffered from a lack of uniformity of equipment, which made them hard to maintain in service, and their mixed gun batteries comprising several calibers made gunnery in combat conditions difficult, since shell splashes were hard to differentiate. Many of the problems that plagued the ships in service, particularly their stability and seakeeping, were a result of the limitation on their displacement.

General characteristics and machinery 
Charles Martels hull was subdivided by 13 transverse bulkheads into 14 watertight compartments and she was fitted with a ram bow. Her forecastle gave her a high freeboard forward, but her quarterdeck was cut down to the main deck level aft. Her hull was given a marked tumblehome to give the 27 cm guns wide fields of fire. Like earlier Huin designs, Charles Martel had a very tall superstructure; she was equipped with two heavy military masts, with a tall flying deck between them. In service, the tall superstructure made her top-heavy, though her high freeboard made her very seaworthy. She normally had a crew of 651 officers and enlisted men, which increased to 751 when serving as a flagship.

The boilers were divided into four boiler rooms and were ducted into two funnels. Her 83-volt electrical power was provided by four 600-ampere dynamos.

Armament 

Charles Martels main armament consisted of two 45-caliber Canon de 305 mm Modèle 1887 guns in two single-gun turrets, one each fore and aft of the superstructure. The hydraulically worked turrets had a range of elevation of -5° to +15°. They fired  cast-iron projectiles at the rate of one round per minute.

The ship's intermediate armament consisted of a pair of 45-caliber Canon de  Modèle 1887 guns in single-gun wing turrets amidships on each side and sponsoned out over the tumblehome of the ship's sides. Their turrets had the same range of elevation as the main battery.

Her secondary armament consisted of eight 45-caliber Canon de  Modèle 1888-91 guns which were mounted in single-gun turrets at the corners of the superstructure. The turrets had an elevation range of from -5° to +15°. The guns could fire their  shells at a rate of fire of four rounds per minute.

Defense against torpedo boats was provided by six quick-firing (QF) 50-caliber Canon de  Modèle 1891 guns, a dozen 40-caliber QF  Modèle 1885 guns, and five 20-caliber QF  revolving cannon, all in unprotected single mounts on the superstructure and in platforms on the military masts. While conducting her sea trials in 1896, two of Charles Martels 65 mm and all of her 37 mm guns were replaced by four additional 47 mm guns.

Her armament suite was rounded out by four  torpedo tubes, two of which were submerged in the ship's hull, one on each broadside, with the other two on single rotating mounts abaft the forward 138 mm turrets; each mount could traverse an arc from 30° to 110° off the centerline.

Armor
The belt had a maximum thickness of 450 mm amidships where it protected the ammunition magazines and propulsion machinery spaces and reduced to  forward and  aft. Coal storage bunkers were placed behind the upper side armor to increase its strength.

The faces and sides of the main and intermediate turrets were protected by armor plates  in thickness and they had  roofs. Their barbettes had  of nickel-steel armor. The secondary turrets had 100 mm sides and  roofs. The curved armored deck was 70 mm on the flat and 100 mm on its slope.

Service history

Active career
Charles Martel was laid down on 1 August 1891 by the Arsenal de Brest and launched on 29 August 1893. After completing fitting-out work, she was commissioned for her trials on 10 January 1896. In October they were interrupted so that the battleship could participate in a naval review in Cherbourg with President Félix Faure and Tsar Nicholas II. While conducting torpedo trials on 21 December, Charles Martel struck an uncharted rock that bent a propeller blade and slightly damaged the hull. Repairs were completed on 1 February 1897 and she was commissioned into the French Navy on 20 February. She was delayed in completing her sea trials, as her boiler tubes had to be replaced with a safer, weld-less design, following an accident aboard Jauréguiberry with the same type of tubes. Following her commissioning for service, she was assigned to the Escadre de la Méditerranée. While working up on 5 March, her rudder servomotor briefly declutched and the ship drifted onto a rock; damage was minimal and she began her voyage to Toulon three days later. Gunnery training revealed problems with some of the guns failing to return to battery that were rectified in October–November.

Faure came aboard Charles Martel to observe a training exercise on 14–16 April and the ship visited Corsica between 21 and 31 May. She participated in the annual fleet maneuvers beginning on 8 July and made port visits in French North Africa before returning to Toulon on 30 July. The ship was assigned to the 2e Division cuirassée (Second Battleship Division) of the Escadre de la Méditerranée in mid-September and  Germain Roustan hoisted his flag aboard, replacing Dieulouard, on 25 September. As tensions rose during the Fashoda Incident with Great Britain, the fleet mobilized on 18 October and sortied to Les Salins d'Hyères. It stood down on 5 November and Charles Martel was docked for maintenance from 11 to 24 November.

In February and March 1899, the squadron visited French Mediterranean ports and Barcelona, Spain. After repairs in Toulon in September, the ship joined the squadron in a cruise in the Eastern Mediterranean that lasted from 11 October to 21 December. She was docked for maintenance in January 1900 and then joined the battleships Brennus, Bouvet, and Jauréguiberry and four protected cruisers for maneuvers off Golfe-Juan, including night firing training on 6 March. Over the course of April, the ships visited numerous French ports along the Mediterranean coast, and on 31 May the fleet steamed to Corsica for a visit that lasted until 8 June. During the fleet maneuvers held that June, Charles Martel led Group II, which included four cruisers and a pair of destroyers, under Roustan's command. The exercises included a blockade of Group III's battleships by Group II. The Escadre de la Méditerranée then rendezvoused with the Escadre du Nord (Northern Squadron) off the coast of Portugal before proceeding to Quiberon Bay for joint maneuvers in July. The maneuvers concluded with a naval review in Cherbourg on 19 July for President Émile Loubet. On 1 August, the fleet departed for Toulon, arriving on 14 August.

The year 1901 passed uneventfully for Charles Martel, except for the fleet maneuvers conducted that year. During the June exercises, Charles Martel was hit by a training torpedo fired by the submarine , which was ruled against the rules, and her light guns sank the torpedo boat  during target practice. The 2e Division cuirassée sailed on 22 August to welcome Nicholas II and his wife, and arrived at Dunkirk, having rendezvoused with the Escadre du Nord on 31 August at Cherbourg en route. On 15 October Aubry de la Noé was relieved by  René-Julien Marquis. Charles Martel was docked for maintenance at the end of the month and had a radio telegraph installed. In early 1902, the ship made the usual visits to French Mediterranean ports.

Reserve fleet

She initially served as the flagship of  Joseph Besson, though by July 1903 her place as flagship had been taken by the battleship . During this period in reserve, the ship was frequently reactivated for short periods to replace active vessels that had to be docked for maintenance. During the fleet maneuvers in July 1905, Charles Martels main guns had a rate of fire of one round every nine minutes and her intermediate guns one round about every four minutes. She remained in the Escadre de réserve; by 1906, she was in the 2e Division, under the command of  Paul-Louis Germinet. Her above-water torpedo tubes were removed on 13 June. On 16 September, she was present for a major fleet review in Marseilles that saw visits from British, Spanish, and Italian squadrons. The ship was maintained in a state of en disponibilité armée, a state of reduced readiness; Charles Martel was in full commission for three months of the year for training, and in reserve with a reduced crew for the remainder. She remained in this status for the duration of 1907. During an exercise off Corsica, the armored cruiser  ran aground on 20 November 1907 during a severe storm. After lightening the cruiser, Charles Martel and the armored cruiser  were able to pull Condé off.

In September 1909 the battleship became the flagship of the Inspector of Flotillas and one of her propellers was damaged by an errant torpedo while the inspector was observing firing exercises by torpedo boats. The following month the Marine nationale was reorganized with the Escadre de la Méditerranée redesignated as the 1re Escadre and the Escadre du Nord as the 2e Escadre, since by then the six  and s had entered service. The new ships allowed for the creation of a new 2e Escadre de ligne (Second Battle Squadron) within the 1re Escadre, Charles Martel became the replacement ship for the 2e Escadre on 5 October and departed for Cherbourg on 5 November, sustaining some storm damage en route. After her arrival on the 13th, she welcomed King Manuel II of Portugal to France and then escorted the British royal yacht Victoria and Albert, with King Edward VII aboard, back to Britain. The ship was assigned to 2e Division de ligne of the 2e Escadre du ligne on 16 October 1910.  Achille Adam hoisted his flag aboard the ship on 21 July 1911. When the s began entering service in that year, the fleet was reorganized again, with Charles Martel and the other older ships being transferred to the new 3e Escadre de ligne on 5 October, which was based in Brest, and Adam becoming commander of its 2e Division de ligne.

The ship's hydraulic reloading machinery for the main and intermediate turrets was replaced by manual-loading gear in August 1911, which generally rendered her combat ineffective. She was present for another naval review off Toulon on 4 September. Adam hauled his flag down on 25 February 1912 and Charles Martel was reduced to reserve status on 1 March. She was reduced to special reserve on 1 July and was transferred to Landévennec, Brittany, in November 1913. Together with her contemporaries Brennus, Carnot and Masséna, Charles Martel was decommissioned and hulked to serve as a barracks ship on 1 April 1914.

After the beginning of World War I in August, the ship hosted the headquarters controlling German prisoners of war temporarily housed in fortresses in Brittany in late September. Some of her boilers were removed during the war to equip three tugboats; her main guns were removed in 1915 and bored out to convert them to Obusier de  Modèle 1915 railroad howitzers. The ship's 274 mm guns were converted into Canon de 274 Modèle 87/93 Glissement railroad guns two years later and her 138.6 mm guns were placed on wheeled gun carriages. Late in the war she was used as a prison ship. Charles Martel was condemned on 30 October 1919 and was listed for sale on 21 September 1920. She was purchased for 675,000 francs on 20 December by the Dutch firm of Franck Rijsdik Shipbreaking & Co. and towed to Hendrik-Ido-Ambacht to begin demolition.

Footnotes

References

 
 
 
 
 
 
 
 
 
 
 

Ships built in France
1893 ships
Battleships of the French Navy